Gaston Crunelle (18 August 1898 in Douai – 13 January 1990) was a French classical flautist and teacher.

From 1941 to 1969 Crunelle trained more than 135 first prizes of flute at the Conservatoire de Paris.

Jean-Pierre Rampal (premier prix 1944) succeeded him in 1969.

In addition to Jean-Pierre Rampal, he trained numerous musicians: Maxence Larrieu, Pol Mule, Jean-Louis Beaumadier, Roger Cotte, James Galway...

References

External links 
 Gaston Crunelle on Robert Bigio flute pages
 Biography of Gaston Crunelle on Flute page
 Gaston Crunelle's discography on Discogs
 Two pictures of Gaston Crunelle
 Trois cadences de Reynaldo Hahn pour le concerto K.299 de Mozart with Gaston Crunelle and Pierre Jamet

French classical flautists
People from Douai
1898 births
1990 deaths
20th-century classical musicians
20th-century flautists